Christopher Kelsay (born October 31, 1979) is a former American football defensive end who played for the Buffalo Bills of the National Football League (NFL) for his entire professional career. He was drafted by the Bills in the second round (48th overall) of the 2003 NFL Draft and was the sixth defensive end selected in the draft. He played collegiately at Nebraska.

Early years 
He attended Auburn High School in Auburn, Nebraska He was an all-state defensive lineman as a senior after recording 142 tackles (69 solos), 14 sacks, 3 fumbles forced, and two fumble recoveries. In 1996, he was an all-state linebacker, leading Auburn to the state semifinals. He also played tight end on offense. In basketball, he was a two-time All-Class C-1 basketball selection, averaging 16 points and 8.4 rebounds a game, in helping Auburn to a 17–3 record in 1997–98. In track, he finished fifth in the Class B shot put and had a personal-best throw of 56 feet,  inches.

College career 
Then he went on to play for the Nebraska Cornhuskers for college football. He was inducted into the NCAA scholar-athlete Hall of Fame in 2002. In 43 games at Nebraska, recorded 135 tackles (61 solos) with 13 sacks, 33 stops for losses, 43 quarterback pressures, 9 pass deflections and 2 forced fumbles He earned Verizon/CoSIDA Academic All-District VII honors in each of his last three seasons and in 2002 was a National Football Foundation/College Hall of Fame Scholar-Athlete ($18,000 postgraduate scholarship recipient) As a senior started the first six and final three games at right defensive end and recorded 38 tackles (17 solos) with seven sacks, 13 stops for losses and 18 QB pressures and was Second-team All-Big 12 Conference. As a junior, he was a Second-team All-America selection by Football News as well as a Second-team Consensus All-Big 12 Conference pick after starting every game at right defensive end and recording a career-high 52 tackles (27 solos) with five sacks and 17 stops for losses. He graduated in December 2002 with a 3.6 GPA and a degree in finance.

Professional career 

Selected in the second round of the 2003 NFL Draft (48th overall) by the Buffalo Bills and was the sixth defensive end selected in the draft. As a rookie Kelsay played in 16 games and made 18 tackles, In 2004, he played 16 games and made nine starts and recorded 40 tackles and 4.5 sacks along with 14 QB pressures. In 2005, he started all 16 games and made 41 tackles and 2.5 sacks. Kelsay produced a career season in 2006 where saw career highs in tackles with 88 and sacks posting 5.5. He was about to enter the free agent market in 2007 but was re-signed before free agency started to a 4-year, $23 Million deal. He has played in every game since 2003. In 2007, he was voted as a defensive captain and started the first 11 games of the season and missed the rest due to injuries. Kelsay announced his retirement on February 27, 2013, after 10 seasons in the NFL, all with the Buffalo Bills.

Personal life
His brother, Chad Kelsay, also played in the NFL. Kelsay was married on March 13, 2004; his wife's name is Natalie and they had a daughter, Harper, on February 9, 2006. Kelsay is the son of Steve and Jackie Kelsay.

References 

1979 births
Living people
American football defensive ends
Nebraska Cornhuskers football players
People from Auburn, Nebraska
Players of American football from Nebraska
Buffalo Bills players
Ed Block Courage Award recipients